Evette Huntley Branson (née Flindt; 12 July 1924 – 8 January 2021) was a British philanthropist, child welfare advocate, and the mother of Richard Branson.

Life and career
Branson was born in Edmonton, Middlesex, England, the daughter of Dorothy Constance (née Jenkins) (19 June 1898 - August 1997) and Major Rupert Ernest Huntley Flindt (11 St Faith's-road, West Norwood, 28 December 1890 - 19 October 1966). As a young adult, she served in the Women's Royal Naval Service (WRENS) during World War II. After the war ended, she toured West Germany as a ballet dancer with Entertainments National Service Association (ENSA). She later became an airline hostess for British South American Airways. After marrying, Branson ran a real estate property business and was a military police officer and probation officer. She also wrote novels and children's books.

In 2013 Branson published her autobiography, Mum's the Word: The High-Flying Adventures of Eve Branson.
Branson established the Eve Branson Foundation and served as its director.

Branson was a member of the board of directors of the International Centre for Missing & Exploited Children ("ICMEC"), the goal of which is to help find missing children, and to stop the exploitation of children. She was a founding member of ICMEC's board of directors in 1999, seeking to generate awareness of the centre's work, and her son Richard was ICMEC's founding sponsor.

Personal life and death
She married, in Frimley, Surrey, on 15 October 1949, Edward James "Ted" Branson, born on 10 March 1918, a former Cavalryman, son of Sir George Arthur Harwin Branson and wife Mona Joyce Bailey. He died on 19 March 2011 in his sleep at the age of 93.

In 2011, Branson escaped a fire at her son's Caribbean home on Necker Island.

Branson died from COVID-19 complications on 8 January 2021, during the COVID-19 pandemic in the United Kingdom at the age of 96. A celebration of her life was posted online by her son Richard. He revealed that he owed his career to his mother, explaining that she had found a necklace in the 1960s and after the police let her keep the jewellery, because nobody had claimed it, she sold it and gave him the funds. "Without that £100, I could never have started Virgin," he said.

Legacy
The VMS Eve the carrier mothership for Virgin Galactic and launch platform for SpaceShipTwo-based Virgin SpaceShips (Tail number: N348MS)    was named in her honour by Virgin Galactic and her son Sir Richard Branson.

A new Airbus A350-1000, G-VEVE - Fearless Lady has been named in her honour and will be delivered to Virgin Atlantic in December 2021 as the first aircraft optimised for the airline's leisure routes.

References

External links

 The Eve Branson Foundation
 Eve Branson obituary at The Times (subscription required)

1924 births
2021 deaths
People from Edmonton, London
Royal Navy personnel of World War II
English ballerinas
Flight attendants
British police officers
British women children's writers
Women's Royal Naval Service ratings
Deaths from the COVID-19 pandemic in England
20th-century English women
20th-century English people
Women police officers